Shamalangi or Shyamalangi (pronounced ) is a ragam in Carnatic music (classical music of southern India). It is the 55th in the 72 melakarta rāgam system of Carnatic music, and is called  in the Muthuswami Dikshitar school of that genre.

Structure and Lakshana

Shamalang is the 1st rāgam in the 10th chakra Disi. Its mnemonic name is Disi-Pa; the mnemonic phrase associated with it is sa ri gi mi pa dha na. Its  structure (ascending and descending scale) is as follows (see swaras in Carnatic music for details on notation and terms):
: 
: 

Shamalangi's swaras are chathusruthi rishabham, sadharana gandharam, prati madhyamam, shuddha dhaivatham and shuddha nishadham. As it is a melakarta rāgam, by definition it is a sampoorna rāgam (containing all seven notes in ascending and descending scale). It is the prati madhyamam equivalent of Jhankaradhwani, which is the 19th melakarta scale.

Janya rāgams
Shamalangi has a couple of minor janya rāgams (derived scales) associated with it (see List of janya rāgams).

Compositions
A few compositions set to Shamalangi rāgam are:

Veera raghava by Koteeswara Iyer
Shyamalangi by Dr. M. Balamuralikrishna
Namo namaste geervani by Muthuswami Dikshitar
Shyamalangi Matangi by Muthuswami Dikshitar

Related rāgams

When shifted using Graha Bhedam, Shamalangi's notes yield two minor melakarta rāgams: Ganamoorti and Vishwambari. Graha Bhedam is the step taken in keeping the relative note frequencies the same while shifting the shadjam to the next note in the rāgam. For more details and an example, see Graha Bhedam on Ganamoorti.

Notes

References

Melakarta ragas